Miss Grand Chile 2023 will be the fifth edition of the Miss Grand Chile pageant, scheduled to be held in mid-2023 in Santiago de Chile. The winner of the contest will represent Chile at Miss Grand International 2023 in Ho Chi Minh City, Vietnam.

Contestants
7 contestants have been confirmed:

References

External links

 

Miss Grand Chile
Chilean awards
Grand Chile